
The Parliamentary Commissioner for the Environment (Te Kaitiaki Taiao a Te Whare Pāremata in Māori) is an independent Officer of the New Zealand Parliament appointed by the Governor-General on the recommendation of the House of Representatives for a five-year term under the Environment Act 1986. The Parliamentary Commissioner for the Environment replaced the Commission for the Environment, a Government agency which was formed in 1972.

Role
The Commissioner is one of three officers of Parliament (the Ombudsmen and the controller and auditor general) who are independent of the executive and who may review activities of the executive government and report directly to Parliament.

The Commissioner's role is to review and provide advice on environmental issues and the system of agencies and processes established by the Government to manage the environment. The primary objective of the office is to contribute to maintaining and improving the quality of the environment in New Zealand through advice given to Parliament, local councils, business, tangata whenua, communities and other public agencies.

The Commissioner may:
 investigate any matter where the environment may be, or has been adversely affected;
 assess the capability, performance and effectiveness of the New Zealand system of environmental management; and
 provide advice and information that will assist people to maintain and improve the quality of the environment.

Commissioners

Commissioners for the environment
 Ian Baumgart (1974–1980)

Parliamentary commissioners for the environment

References

External links
Parliamentary Commissioner for the Environment

Environment, Parliamentary Commissioner for the
PCE
Officers of the Parliament of New Zealand